Moazzem Hossain Ratan is a Bangladesh Awami League politician and the incumbent Member of Parliament from Sunamganj-1.

Early life
Moazzem Hossain Ratan was born on 13 June 1972 to a Bengali Muslim family in the village of Nowdhar in Dharmapasha Thana, Sunamganj Mahakuma, Sylhet District, Bangladesh. His brother, Muzzammil Hossain Rukn, is the chairman of Dharmapasha Upazila. He completed his undergraduate education in Engineering.

Career
Ratan was elected to Parliament in 2008 and 2014 from Sunamganj-1 as a Bangladesh Awami League candidate. In 2008, while campaigning for the election, he was attacked and his car was vandalized by Bangladesh Awami League activists. He is a Member of the Parliamentary Standing Committee on Posts and Telecommunications ministry.

On September 30, 2019, the ACC started an investigation against Moazzem Hossain Ratan for illegally acquiring assets in a casino scandal in Dhaka. As his name appeared in the media of Bangladesh, the ACC decided to search the assets of at least 100 people including Ratan. The five-member search team was led by director Syed Iqbal Hossain. Later, on the recommendation of the search team, Ratan was banned from going abroad.

References

Awami League politicians
Living people
1972 births
9th Jatiya Sangsad members
10th Jatiya Sangsad members
11th Jatiya Sangsad members
People from Dharampasha Upazila